Jean Khayat (born 3 May 1942) is a Tunisian fencer. He competed in the individual foil and sabre events at the 1960 Summer Olympics.

References

External links
 

1942 births
Living people
Tunisian male foil fencers
Olympic fencers of Tunisia
Fencers at the 1960 Summer Olympics
Sportspeople from Tunis
Tunisian male sabre fencers
20th-century Tunisian people